Stuart Boag is the name of these people:
Stuart Boag, New Zealand National Party candidate and president of the Young Nationals
Stuart Boag, 1998 actor of Elf in The Fairies